Horry County Schools#Middle Schools in South Carolina
Torrance Unified School District#Primary schools in California